Krasnogvardeyskoye is a rural locality (a selo) and the administrative center of Krasnogvardeysky District of Stavropol Krai, Russia. Population:

References

Rural localities in Stavropol Krai
Stavropol Governorate